TTFC can refer to one of the following football clubs:

 Tain Thistle FC
 Tetbury Town FC 
 Thamesmead Town F.C.
 Thatcham Town F.C.
 Thetford Town F.C.
 Thrapston Town F.C.
 Tipton Town F.C.
 Tiverton Town F.C.
 Trowbridge Town F.C.
 Tullamore Town F.C.